The United Nations resolutions concerning Yemen have mainly dealt with the North Yemen Civil War, 1994 civil war in Yemen and Yemeni Civil War (2014–present).

List of Security Council Resolutions

See also 

 Yemeni peace process
 List of Middle East peace proposals

References 

United Nations Security Council resolutions concerning Yemen
Yemen
Yemen-related lists
Middle East peace efforts